Prince Francis Joseph of Battenberg  (24 September 1861 – 31 July 1924) was the fourth and youngest son and child of Prince Alexander of Hesse and by Rhine and his morganatic wife Julia, Princess of Battenberg.

Biography
At one time, he was considered for the throne of Bulgaria, which eventually went to his brother Alexander; nonetheless, as Alexander was unmarried and without legitimate heirs at the time, Francis Joseph was considered heir presumptive to the throne. He followed his brother to Bulgaria, where he served as a colonel in the Bulgarian cavalry, seeing action during the Serbo-Bulgarian War. During the coup of 1886, he was arrested and expelled from Bulgaria, along with his brother.

From an early age Francis Joseph showed great interest in science, and unlike his brothers – who pursued careers in the military – he pursued a career in academics; in 1891 he published an academic study on Bulgarian economic history, which he dedicated to his brother.

At a family reunion in London in 1894 Franz Joseph met Consuelo Vanderbilt, the daughter of an extremely wealthy American railway tycoon William Kissam Vanderbilt. He made a marriage proposal to Consuelo, but she disliked him and turned him down.

In 1897 he married Princess Ana Petrović-Njegoš of Montenegro (1874–1971), the sixth daughter of King Nicholas I of Montenegro; they had no children. He served as a colonel in the Montenegrin Army during the Balkan Wars.

They lived in Prinz Emil Palais, but upon the outbreak of World War I, he and his wife moved to Switzerland, where he lived until his death in 1924. He was a close friend of his brother-in-law King Victor Emmanuel III of Italy, whom he visited often.

Honours
He received the following orders and decorations:

Ancestry

Notes

External links 
 

1861 births
1924 deaths
Battenberg family
Bulgarian military personnel
Montenegrin military personnel of the Balkan Wars
Recipients of the Order of Bravery, 4th class
Officers of the Order of Military Merit (Bulgaria)
Knights Grand Cross of the Order of Saints Maurice and Lazarus
Honorary Knights Grand Cross of the Royal Victorian Order
Honorary Knights Commander of the Order of the Bath